The term Cadillac V8 may refer to any of a number of V8 engines produced by the Cadillac Division of General Motors since it pioneered the first such mass-produced engine in 1914.

Most commonly, such a reference is to one of the manufacturer's most successful, best known, or longest-lived 90° V8 engine series. Also notable was the Northstar, which debuted in 1992 as a 4.6 litre, and was also produced in 4.4 L and 4.2 L versions.

When the Northstar engine series ended production in 2010 it became the last General Motors division to retain its own proprietary V8 design.  This changed when Cadillac created the twin-turbo 'Blackwing' engine in 2019.

L-head

The Type 51 was the first Cadillac V8. Introduced in 1914, it was the standard engine for 1915 Cadillac models. It was a 90° design with an L-head (sidevalve) configuration and was water-cooled.

This engine was designed under the leadership of Cadillac's chief engineer (1914-1917), Scottish-born D (D'Orsay) McCall White (1880 -), later a vice president of Cadillac. Hired by Henry Leland for his V-engine expertise from his employment as chief engineer at Napier, and previously Daimler at Coventry, he was later to move to Nash with LaFayette. White was appointed to a committee of three to supervise the development of the V12 Liberty aircraft motor, that later contributed to cross town rival Lincoln Motor Company introducing the Lincoln L series much later in 1917.

The engine was refined for 1923 with a cross-plane crankshaft that introduced the (now standard) 90° offset for each pair of cylinders which improved balance and smoothness.

The L-head was on the Ward's 10 Best Engines of the 20th century list.

L-head applications:
 Cadillac Type 51
 Cadillac Type 53
 Cadillac Type 55
 Cadillac Type 57
 Cadillac Type 59
 Cadillac Type 61
 Cadillac V-63
 Cadillac Series 341
 Oldsmobile Light Eight

Cadillac created a new V8, the 341, for 1928. It was a   engine and produced . The same year saw the introduction of the synchromesh transmission. This engine was used in the Series 341 and 341B cars of 1928 and 1929.

This used a  bore and stroke. This engine was used in the Cadillac Series 353 and Series 355.

Monobloc
A  "monobloc engine" was used in 1936's Series 60. It was designed to be the company's next-generation powerplant at reduced cost from the 353 and Cadillac V12. The monobloc's cylinders and crankcase were cast as a single unit,  and it used hydraulic valve lifters for durability. This design allowed the creation of the mid-priced Series 60 line.

This engine was closely related to a monobloc design earlier introduced in the  modified with a  bore for the 1936-1948  engine. This was used in the Series 60/60S/61/62/63/65/67 and 70/72/75. It was also used in a dual setup in tanks, e.g. M5 Stuart and the M24 Chaffee, in World War II mated to a Hydramatic transmission.

LaSalle

These engines were produced through 1948.

OHV

331 series
For 1949, Cadillac and Oldsmobile each produced a new V8 design (the Oldsmobile engine was the 303). Both of the engines were overhead valve designs, pioneered by Buick. The Cadillac 331 engine featured a "dry" (coolant exited through an assembly attached directly to the cylinder heads), open runner (requiring the use of a tappet valve cover) intake manifold, rear-mounted distributor, and shaft-mounted rockers. Crankshaft end play is carried by the rear bearing on the two GM engines. It has the lighter 'skirtless' block where the oil pan flange does not descend appreciably below the crankshaft centerline and they both have a partial integral cast iron clutch housing that compares to the early Chrysler Hemi V8 design. 1955 331 engines went to a lighter "flat back" that bolted to a clutch and flywheel housing at the front of the transmission.

This engine features an oiling system which uses a central cast-in passage between the lifter galleries feeding oil to the cam and crank by grooves machined into the cam bores. A single drilled passage per bearing saddle feeds both cam and crank journals. Shared with the Oldsmobile Rocket V8 is how the lifters are supplied oil through small 'bleeds' instead of placing the lifters directly into the right and left side oil supply galleries. Many early racers would replace the Cadillac hydraulic lifter and rocker assemblies with the solid lifters and adjustable rockers from the Studebaker V8 for operation at higher engine speeds.

365
For the 3 years that the 365 was made, the base versions had a single 4 barrel carburetor. The 1956 version produced 285 horsepower. The 1957 version raised that base engine output to 300 horsepower, while the 1958 base version cranked out 310. Eldorados featured multi-carb engines in all 3 years. The Eldorado engines were optional on all other Cadillacs too. The 1958 Eldorado 3-2bbl version produced .

390

390 series

For the 1963 model year Cadillac redesigned  its V8 engine, modernizing the tooling used in the production line while optimizing the engine's design. Although it shared the same layout and architecture with the 1949-vintage engine, the revised engine had shorter connecting rods and was  lower,  narrower, and  shorter. The accessories (water pump, power steering pump, distributor) mounted on a die-cast aluminum housing at the front of the engine for improved accessibility. An alternator replaced the former generator. The crankshaft was cored out to make it both lighter and stronger.

429
It also included its first emission control system, a positive crankcase ventilation unit was installed beginning in the 1964 model year. The 429 was used through the 1967 model year. (It is not uncommon to find an early 1964 model year with the '63 390 V8 as Cadillac tried to use up the older engines in stock.)

472 series
Cadillac introduced an all-new engine for 1968. Although the modernized 390 series engine was compact and light for its displacement and output,  represented the limit of the original architecture's expansion, and it had been surpassed by Chrysler's 440 and Lincoln's 462 and 460.  Cadillac went bigger - with provision for even more expansion.

"Extensively redesigned" to ease maintenance, it used 10% fewer parts and 25% fewer gasketed joints as before. It delivered  at 4400 rpm and a massive  torque at just 3000 rpm. The new engine was about  heavier than its predecessor. It was used through 1974. It was designed with potential for a  displacement.

500

The 500 was exclusive to the Eldorado until 1975 where the powerplant was standard in all Cadillacs except for the Seville, which was powered by a fuel-injected Oldsmobile 350.

425 series
Starting in the mid to late 1970s Cadillac expanded its product range offering more mid sized vehicles, i.e. sedans and coupes. While initially the Cadillac Seville for example, which was positioned in the mid sized segment used a variant of  Oldsmobile based architecture V8, Cadillac also began work on its own proprietary engines.

In 1977 Cadillac introduced a new  V8, based on the architecture of the 472, but with a smaller,  bore and the same  stroke. The new engine was also  lighter.

The 425 was used through 1979 on all Cadillacs except the Seville and 1979 Eldorados.

368
The reduction in displacement was largely an effort to meet CAFE requirements for fuel economy. Throttle-body fuel injection was now standard on Eldorado and Seville when equipped with the 368. Rear-wheel drive cars and the Commercial Chassis for hearse and ambulance builders used the Rochester Quadrajet 4-barrel carburetor.

Cadillac referred to this new TBI (throttle-body fuel injection) system as Digital fuel injection (DFI); this particular induction system was later adopted by other GM divisions, except on Oldsmobile V8s, and was used well into the 1990s on GM trucks.

This engine was standard on all Cadillacs except the redesigned Seville, in which it was optional.

V8-6-4

For 1981 Cadillac introduced a new engine that would become notorious for its unreliable electronics, the V8-6-4 (L62). The L61 had not provided a significant improvement in the company's CAFE numbers, so Cadillac and Eaton Corporation devised a cylinder deactivation system called Modulated Displacement that would shut off two or four cylinders in low-load conditions such as highway cruising, then reactivate them when more power was needed. When deactivated, solenoids mounted to those cylinders' rocker arm studs would disengage the fulcrums, allowing the rockers to "float" and leave the valves closed despite the continued action of the pushrods. These engines are easily identified by their rocker covers, which each have elevated sections over 2 cylinders with electrical connectors on top. With the valves closed the cylinders acted as air-springs, which both eliminated the feel of "missing" and kept the cylinders warm for instant combustion upon reactivation. Simultaneously, the engine control module would reduce the amount of fuel metered through the TBI unit. On the dashboard, an "MPG Sentinel" digital display could show the number of cylinders in operation, average or current fuel consumption (in miles per gallon), or estimated range based on the amount of fuel remaining in the tank and the average mileage since the last reset.

Another rare and advanced feature introduced with DFI was Cadillac's truly "on-board" diagnostics. For mechanics who had to deal with the 368s, the cars contained diagnostics that did not require the use of special external computer scan-tools. The new Electronic Climate Control display, along with the MPG Sentinel, provided on-board readout of any stored trouble codes, instantaneous readings from all the various engine sensors, forced cycling of the underhood solenoids and motors, and on the V8-6-4 engines, manual cylinder-pair control. Cadillac hailed the L62 as a technological masterpiece, and made it standard equipment across the whole Cadillac line.

While cylinder deactivation would make a comeback some 20 years later with modern computing power (and using oil pressure to deactivate the valves by collapsing the lifters) Cadillac's 1981 V8-6-4 proved to have insurmountable engineering problems. The main issue was that the Engine Control Module simply lacked the robustness, programming and processing speed to efficiently manage the cylinder-deactivation under all load conditions. In the era before electronically operated EGR valves, the engineers also made an error in using a "back-pressure-type" EGR valve. While this early effort to match the vacuum-controlled EGR volume more accurately to the engine's load made sense in a 'normal' engine, it had the effect of causing pinging (detonation) problems in the V8-6-4 engine, because 4 cylinders operating under higher load needed more EGR, while they were actually producing less exhaust flow and therefore less back-pressure to operate the valve.

In an effort to increase reliability, Cadillac issued thirteen updated PROM chips for the ECMs, but many of these engines simply had their Modulated Displacement function disabled by dealers, leaving them with permanent eight-cylinder operation. This was accomplished by merely disconnecting a single wire from the transmission's "3rd-gear switch", or running it through a switch inside the car for manual override. The 368 was dropped from most Cadillac passenger cars after the 1981 model year, although the V8-6-4 remained the standard engine for Fleetwood Limousines and the carbureted 368 remained in the Commercial Chassis through 1984.

The 368 has the distinction of being the last traditional "big-block" cast-iron pushrod V8 engine available in a production car. It lasted through 1984 in the limousines. Rival big blocks, 396, 400 (Chrysler & GM), 402, 426, 440, 454, 455, 460, etc. disappeared between 1976 and 1978. RWD models were coupled with the heavy duty THM400 transmission, the last factory-produced GM passenger car fitted with this transmission.

GM reintroduced an updated fuel management system in 2005, marketed as Active Fuel Management or Displacement on Demand.

Cadillac High Technology engine

Northstar

Cadillac's DOHC, four valves per cylinder Northstar debuted in 1992, its most technologically advanced engine ever.

Although Oldsmobile, Pontiac, and Buick have borrowed the Northstar architecture for their V8 (and even V6) engines, it was not until the 2004 Pontiac Bonneville that a non-Cadillac used the Northstar name.

4.6 L
The   version was available starting in 1993 on the Seville SLS and Eldorado ESC. The Allanté, the Seville STS and the Eldorado ETC had the  version of the Northstar. In 1994, the DeVille Concours received the  version of this engine. By 1996, the Northstar engine became standard equipment in the front-wheel-drive Cadillac line. The  engine was in the Seville SLS 1993–2004, Eldorado ESC 1993–2002, Standard Deville 1996–2005, Devile d'elegance 1997–1999, and Deville DHS 2000–2005. The  version was used in the Seville STS 1993–2004, Eldorado ETC 1996–2002, Deville Concours 1997–1999, and Deville DTS 2000–2005. Its final appearance was in the final generation of the DTS series, produced from 2006 to 2011.

Non-Cadillac uses:

The  version of the Northstar was also standard equipment in the top GXP trim level of the Pontiac Bonneville, produced only in 2004 and 2005. It was also the top engine option available in the Buick Lucerne CXS and a  NHP (Northstar High Output) version in the Buick Lucerne Super. produced from 2006 through 2011. The Lucerne shared its platform and the Detroit/Hamtramck assembly plant with the final generation of the Cadillac DTS.

4.4 L
The  versions were all supercharged, exclusive to Cadillac's V-series. The present STS-V engine, since 2006, produces  and  under the SAE certified rating system.

The 2006 - 2008 XLR-V uses the same supercharged Northstar V8 as the STS-V, though output is down somewhat due to design changes made to accommodate the model's more limited underhood space. The supercharger and four intercoolers are built into the intake manifold.

The bores were reduced in size to increase block strength, increasing the safety margin under boost.

4.0 L
The  is the Oldsmobile Aurora variant, never installed in a Cadillac. The Aurora's cylinder heads had lower flow characteristics to match the engine's reduced size. This engine produces .

Cadillac use of non-Cadillac V8s

Fleetwood (RWD)/Deville (RWD)/Brougham (RWD)
The 1976 through 1979 Seville was only available with Oldsmobile engines. (The engine was "marketed" as a Cadillac engine and was exclusive to the Cadillac product line, but was in reality produced by the Oldsmobile division). Buyers were able to choose between 350 gas and 350 diesel versions. From 1982 to 1985, all rear-wheel drive Cadillacs (except for the limousines) could be ordered with the  Oldsmobile LF9 Diesel V8. In fact, for most of its life, the 1980-1985 version of Cadillac's Seville came standard with Oldsmobile's V8 diesel, with the gas engine being a no-cost option.

From 1986 to 1990, the rear-wheel drive Cadillac Brougham used a carbureted  Oldsmobile V8 (replacing the Cadillac HT-4100). In 1991 the Oldsmobile 307 was replaced with a  throttle body fuel-injected small-block Chevrolet L03 V8 - same powerplant used in Chevrolet's Caprice and C/K light trucks). In 1993 the   L05 V8 became standard in the newly renamed Cadillac Fleetwood.

With the introduction of the Escalade to the Cadillac lineup, the small-block Chevrolet L31 V8 (Vortec 5700) was used, as it was part of the Chevy truck line on which the Escalade was based. In 2001, the newly redesigned 2002 Escalade picked up the performance version of the 6.0 L Generation III series engine (RPO code LQ9) although the regular length 2002-2005 Escalade 2wd used the 5.3-liter LM7 version of the Generation III series engine. From 2007-2014, all gas-only Cadillac Escalades have been equipped with Generation IV 6.2L engines. This new engine option is shared with the GMC Yukon/Yukon XL Denali. Escalade Hybrids used a 6.0-liter version of the Generation IV series engine. Since 2015, gas-powered Escalades have used Generation V 6.2L engines. The Escalade-V uses a supercharged version of the 6.2-liter Gen V engine, the LT4.

CTS-V
The 2004 to 2005 Cadillac CTS-V used the previous generation Corvette C5 Z06's  5.7 L LS6 Gen III V8.

CT5-V Blackwing
The 2022-present CT5-V Blackwing carries a supercharged 6.2 L LT4 variant of the Gen V series engine, producing , the most powerful Cadillac sedan in history.

Cadillac 4.2 liter twin-turbo V-8 LTA engine

The 4.2 liter V8 engine (GM RPO code LTA) is an eight-cylinder, dual overhead cam (DOHC) twin turbo engine produced by General Motors specifically for use in Cadillac luxury vehicles. The engine is the result of a new clean-sheet engine design as well as Cadillac's first twin-turbo V-8 engine. It first launched on the 2019 Cadillac CT6.

See also
 Cadillac V16 engine (used during the 1930s)

From the 1950s through the 1970s, each GM division had its own V8 engine family. Some were shared among other divisions, but each respective design was engineered and developed by its own division:
 Buick V8 engine	
 GMC V8 engine
 Chevrolet small-block engine	
 Chevrolet big-block engine	
 Oldsmobile V8 engine	
 Pontiac V8 engine
 Holden V8 engine

GM later standardized on the later generations of the Chevrolet design:	
 General Motors small-block engine
 List of GM engines

References

V8
V8 engines